Panampatti devandira Kula velalar is a village in the Annavasalrevenue block of Pudukkottai district in the Indian state of Tamil Nadu. Panampatti falls under Illupur taluk.

Culture 
The village is known for Pumalandi temple. Every five years a festival is celebrated in the name of Padyal.

Shiva Rathri 
Every year, the Shiv rathiri festival is celebrated. Pilgrims bring milk copper vessels on their heads and walk towards Ayyanar temple.

Pusai padayal 
Pusai padayal means anyone who believes that the god fulfils their aspirations and offers a healthy life.Ddevotees offer padayal to the god, after completion of puja.

References

Villages in Pudukkottai district